BUIC could refer to:
 Back Up Interceptor Control, a former air defense command and control system for North American Air Defense
 Bangkok University International College
 Birmingham University Imaging Centre
 Boston University India Club